Geoghan is a surname. Notable people with the surname include:

Jim Geoghan, American television producer
John Geoghan (1935–2003), key figure in the Roman Catholic sex abuse cases in Boston, Massachusetts in the 1990s and 2000s
Lisa Geoghan (b. 1967), British actress best known for playing PC/CAD Officer Polly Page on The Bill

See also
Geoghegan